Lateral cutaneous nerve may refer to:

In the upper limb:
 Lateral cutaneous nerve of forearm
 Inferior lateral cutaneous nerve of arm
 Superior lateral cutaneous nerve of arm

In the lower limb:
 Lateral cutaneous nerve of thigh